John Richard Alden (23 January 1908, Grand Rapids, Michigan – 14 August 1991, Clearwater, Florida) was an American historian and author of a number of books on the era of the American Revolutionary War.

Biography
Alden graduated from the University of Michigan with A.B. in 1929), M.A. in 1930, and Ph.D. in 1939. After teaching at Michigan State Normal College (now called Eastern Michigan University), and subsequently at Bowling Green State University in Ohio, he taught at the University of Nebraska from 1945 to 1955. He joined the faculty of Duke University in 1955, where he chaired the Department of History from 1957 to 1960, and in 1963 was appointed James B. Duke Professor of History. He retired from Duke University in 1976. He also taught at the University of Chicago and Columbia University. He was a reviewer for the New York Times Book Review.

In 1934, Alden married Pearl B. Wells (1906–1979). In 1980 he married Kathleen C. Smith, who died in 1990. Upon his death in 1991 he was survived by a daughter from his first marriage and by a granddaughter.

Awards and honors
 1945 — Albert J. Beveridge Award of the American Historical Association
 1955 — Guggenheim Fellowship for the academic year 1955–1956
 1960 — Commonwealth Fund Lecturer at University College, London
 1960 — Donald Fleming Lecturer (23rd Series) at Louisiana State University
 1979 — festschrift published as The Revolutionary War in the South—Power, Conflict, and Leadership: Essays in Honor of John Richard Alden

Selected publications

References

External links

1908 births
1991 deaths
20th-century American historians
American male non-fiction writers
20th-century American biographers
University of Michigan alumni
University of Nebraska faculty
Duke University faculty
People from Grand Rapids, Michigan
20th-century American male writers